Kuźniar is a Polish-language surname. It is an occupational surname literally meaning "blacksmith" (archaic), from "kuźnia", "smithy".

Notable people with this surname include:

Jarosław Kuźniar (born 1978), Polish television and radio presenter
Zdzisław Kuźniar (born 1931), Polish theater, film and television actor

Polish-language surnames
Occupational surnames